The Council on the Disposition of the Tithes is a leadership body in the Church of Jesus Christ of Latter-day Saints (LDS Church), composed of the First Presidency, the Presiding Bishopric, and Quorum of the Twelve Apostles. The council determines how tithing funds of the church will be spent. The council oversees revenue, investments and expenditures valued at billions of dollars per year. While the LDS Church produces an annual report and employs an independent auditing department which reviews the financial activities of the church, it has not published full financial reports since 1959.

History
On July 8, 1838, church founder Joseph Smith was directed by revelation to establish this council. At the time, the council members included the First Presidency, along with both the bishopric and high council in Far West, Missouri. The council met one time under Smith, on July 26, 1838. There is no record of the council meeting again under Smith.

The council did not meet again until 1943. In the early 1940s, J. Reuben Clark (then a member of the First Presidency) conducted a two-year review of early church history to determine how the current church could more closely align with original financial administration. He proposed, and the First Presidency and the Quorum of the Twelve accepted, that the council be reestablished and meet annually. It has met annually since 1943.

Membership of the council
As of October 2020:

See also

Council of the Church
Common Council of the Church
Finances of The Church of Jesus Christ of Latter-day Saints
World Church Leadership Council

References 

Leadership positions in the Church of Jesus Christ of Latter-day Saints
Organizational subdivisions of the Church of Jesus Christ of Latter-day Saints
 Council
Religious organizations established in 1838
Council on the Disposition of the Tithes
1838 establishments in Missouri
Quorum of the Twelve Apostles (LDS Church)
Tithing in Mormonism